Mordellistena dvoraki is a species of beetle in the genus Mordellistena of the family Mordellidae. It was described in 1956 by Ermisch and can be found in such European countries as Bulgaria, Czech Republic, France, Germany, Hungary, Poland, Republic of Macedonia and Slovakia.

References

dvoraki
Beetles described in 1956
Beetles of Europe